Konstantin Mikhailov could be:

Konstantin Mikhaylov (journalist), a Russian journalist
Konstantin Mihailov, a Bulgarian ice hockey goaltender